Loyalty is the sixth studio album by American rapper Soulja Boy. It was released on February 3, 2015, by Stacks on Deck Entertainment.

Background
On November 17, 2014, DeAndre Way announced via his Instagram that he signed a new label deal to Universal Music Group. He also revealed the title, cover art and the release date to his upcoming fourth studio album, titled Loyalty. He later announced the album would be released on December 2, 2014. On February 3, 2015, Way announced that he would be releasing the album digitally on iTunes, and it would also be released independently on his label Stacks on Deck Entertainment.

Singles
The album was preceded by only one single, "Hurricane". It was initially released on December 27, 2014 and as a single on January 2, 2015. Its music video was released on January 10, 2015, directed by HiDefinition.

Track listing

References

2015 albums
Soulja Boy albums